Krishnapuram is a village in Krishna district of the Indian state of Andhra Pradesh. It is located in Pamidimukkala mandal of Nuzvid revenue division.

References 

Villages in Krishna district
Villages in Andhra Pradesh Capital Region